Li Guizhi (born July 4, 1993) is a Chinese swimmer.

At the 2012 Summer Paralympics she won a silver medal at the Women's 50 metre freestyle S11 event and a bronze medal at the Women's 100 metre freestyle S11 event.

At the 2016 Summer Paralympics she won a gold medal at the Women's 50 metre freestyle S11 event with a world record and paralympic record of 30.73 and a silver medal at the Women's 100 metre freestyle S11 event with 1:08.31.

References

Living people
Swimmers at the 2012 Summer Paralympics
Swimmers at the 2016 Summer Paralympics
Swimmers at the 2020 Summer Paralympics
Medalists at the 2012 Summer Paralympics
Medalists at the 2016 Summer Paralympics
Medalists at the 2020 Summer Paralympics
Paralympic gold medalists for China
Paralympic silver medalists for China
Paralympic bronze medalists for China
Paralympic swimmers of China
S11-classified Paralympic swimmers
Chinese female freestyle swimmers
1993 births
Paralympic medalists in swimming
21st-century Chinese women